Bovine respiratory disease (BRD) is the most common and costly disease affecting beef cattle in the world. It is a complex, bacterial or viral infection that causes pneumonia in calves which can be fatal. The infection is usually a sum of three codependent factors: stress, an underlying viral infection, and a new bacterial infection. 
The diagnosis of the disease is complex since there are multiple possible causes.

The disease manifests itself most often in calves within four weeks of weaning, when calves are sorted and often sold to different farms; a common nickname for BRD is "shipping fever." It is not known whether the stress itself, co-mingling, or travel conditions are at most to blame, and while studies have identified general stressing factors like transport and cold weather conditions, there is still no conclusive evidence on more specific factors (e.g. distance, transport mode, temperature, or temperature volatility).

Causes
BRD is a "multi-factorial syndrome" that is dependent on a number of different causes.  The pathologic condition commonly arises where the causative organism becomes established by secondary infection, following a primary bacterial or viral infection, which may occur after stress, e.g. from handling or transport. Usually all three of these factors must be present in order to cause BRD. Viral agents are often present in the herd for an extended time, with almost no symptoms, and only cause severe complications with a bacterial infection.

The bacterial agents most commonly linked with BRD are Mannheimia haemolytica, Pasteurella multocida, Histophilus somni, and Mycoplasma bovis.  M. haemolytica serovar A1 is known as a particularly common bacterial cause of the disease.   Viral agents include Bovine viral diarrhea (BVD), Infectious Bovine Rhinotracheitis (IBR), Bovine respiratory syncytial virus (BRSV), and Parainfluenza type-3 virus (PI-3).

Clinical signs and diagnosis
BRD often develops within 4 weeks of cattle transport. The biggest sign of the pneumonia that BRD causes is depression, shown as droopy ears, dull eyes, and social isolation. Additionally, most cows will have a fever above . Other symptoms include  coughing, decreased appetite, and breathing difficulty.

Treatment and control
Because of the number of possible viral/bacterial precursors to BRD, there are a number of treatment options circling around the three main aggravators of the disease: Viruses, Bacteria, and Stress.

Vaccination
Vaccinations exist for several biological BRD precursors, but the multitude of possible precursors complicates the process of choosing a vaccine regime. Additionally, vaccines are not completely effective in stopping the disease, but are merely helpful in mitigation. Many of the problems with vaccine effectiveness rest with improper use, such as failing to time vaccine doses appropriately, or not administering them before shipping.

Vaccines are available for a number of viral/bacterial agents, including IBR, PI3, BVD, BRSV, Pasteurella, and Haemophilus somnus. Many of these vaccines can be given simultaneously, because of their similar dosing schedule. For example, IBR, PI3, BVD, and BRSV vaccines are often sold in combination with each other.

Antibiotics
In the absence of vaccination (often because calves are bought unvaccinated), antibiotics can help to stop the bacterial factors of the disease. The Virginia Cooperative Extension recommends Micotil, Nuflor, and Baytril 100 as newer antibiotics that do not need daily dosing, but also notes that Naxcel, Excenel, and Adspec are effective as well.

Stress management
Stress often serves as the final precursor to BRD. The diseases that make up BRD can persist in a cattle herd for a long period of time before becoming symptomatic, but immune systems weakened by stress can stop controlling the disease. Major sources of stress come from the shipping process 
and from the co-mingling of cattle.

Weather may be another possible factor. Cases are more common in the fall (although this is the traditional time to sell cattle), and while the relationship between weather and BRD is poorly understood, it is often suggested to avoid transporting cattle during extreme weather.

See also
 Pneumonia (non-human)
 Pasteurellosis

Notes

References

Respiratory disease